Frank Joseph Zamboni Jr. (January 16, 1901 – July 27, 1988) was an American inventor and engineer whose most famous invention is the modern ice resurfacer, with his surname being registered as a trademark for these devices.

Biography
Zamboni was born in 1901 in Eureka, Utah, to Italian immigrants. His parents soon bought a farm in Lava Hot Springs, Idaho near Pocatello, Idaho, where he grew up. In 1920, he moved with his parents to the harbor district of Los Angeles, where his older brother George was operating an auto repair shop. After Frank attended a trade school in Chicago, he and his younger brother Lawrence opened an electrical supply business in 1922 in the Los Angeles suburb of Hynes (now part of Paramount). The following year he married and eventually had three children, a son and two daughters. In 1927, he and Lawrence added an ice-making plant and entered the block ice business. They continued their ice business in 1939, but saw little future in that business with the advent of electrically operated refrigeration units. They decided to use their excess refrigeration equipment to open an ice rink nearby.

In 1940, the brothers, along with a cousin, Pete Zamboni, opened the Iceland rink, which proved very popular, in no small part because Frank had devised a way to eliminate rippling caused by the pipes that were laid down to keep the rink frozen. (The rink still operates and is still owned by the Zamboni family.) He obtained a patent for that innovation in 1946. Then, in 1949, he invented a machine that transformed the job of resurfacing an ice rink from a five-man, 90-minute task to a one-man, 15-minute job. The initial machine included a hydraulic cylinder from an A-20 attack plane, a chassis from an oil derrick, a Jeep engine, a wooden bin to catch the shavings, and a series of pulleys. His son, Richard, said, "It took him nine years. One of the reasons he stuck with it was that everyone told him he was crazy." Zamboni did not expect to make more but, after seeing the machine, Sonja Henie immediately ordered two, and then the Chicago Blackhawks placed an order. Zamboni applied for a patent in 1949 – obtained in 1953 – and set up Frank J. Zamboni & Co. in Paramount to build and sell the machines.

The machine shaves ice off the surface, collects the shavings, washes the ice, and spreads a thin coat of fresh water onto the surface. In the early 1950s, Zamboni built them on top of Jeep CJ-3Bs, then on stripped Jeep chassis from 1956 through 1964. Demand for the machine proved great enough that his company added a second plant in Brantford, Ontario and a branch office in Switzerland. Though the term Zamboni was (and remains) trademarked by his company, the name is sometimes generically used for any brand of ice resurfacing machine.

In the 1970s, he invented machines to remove water from outdoor artificial turf surfaces, remove paint stripes from the same surfaces, and roll up and lay down artificial turf in domed stadiums. His final invention, in 1983, was an automatic edger to remove ice buildup from the edges of rinks.

He died of cardiac arrest at Long Beach Memorial Hospital in July 1988 at the age of 87, about two months after his wife's death. He also had lung cancer. The Zamboni company has sold more than 10,000 units of its signature machine, the Zamboni Ice Resurfacer, commonly known as a "Zamboni." The 10,000th machine was delivered to the Montreal Canadiens in April 2012 for use at the Bell Centre. The company is still owned and operated by the Zamboni family, including Frank's son and grandson.  His remains are buried at All Souls Cemetery in Long Beach.

Zamboni was inducted into the Ice Skating Institute's Hall of Fame in 1965, and he was awarded an Honorary Doctorate of Engineering from Clarkson University in 1988. Frank was posthumously inducted into the NEISMA Hall of Fame in 1988, the United States Figure Skating Hall of Fame in 2000, the World Figure Skating Hall of Fame in 2006, the National Inventors Hall of Fame in 2007, the U.S. Hockey Hall of Fame in 2009, and into the United States Speed Skating Hall of Fame in 2013.

The Frank J. Zamboni School, in Paramount, is named after him.

Patents

Early patents:
Country - U.S.  #1,655,034  Title: Adjustable Reaction Resistance (Electrical)      Date Issued: Jan 3, 1928 
Country - U.S.  #1,710,149  Title: Reactance Coil (Electrical)                      Date Issued: Mar 11, 1930 
Country - U.S.  #1,804,852  Title: Circuit Controlling Reactance Coil (Electrical)  Date Issued: May 12, 1931 
Country - U.S.  #2,411,919  Title: Ice Rink Floor                                   Date Issued: Dec 3, 1946 
Country - U.S.  #2,594,603  Title: Refrigerated Liquid Storage Tank                 Date Issued: Apr 29, 1952 
Country - U.S.  #2,738,170  Title: Refrigerated Milk Storage Tank and Pasteurizer   Date Issued: Mar 13, 1956

Ice resurfacers:
Country - U.S.  #2,642,679  Title: Ice Resurfacer                                   Date Issued: Jun 23, 1953 
Country - U.S.  #2,763,939  Title: Ice Resurfacer                                   Date Issued: Sep 25, 1953 
Country - U.S.  #3,044,193  Title: Ice Resurfacer                                   Date Issued: Jul 17, 1962 
Country - U.S.  #3,622,205  Title: Down Pressure                                    Date Issued: Nov 23, 1971

Ice resurfacer-related products:
Country - U.S.  #4,372,617  Title: Ice Edger                                        Date Issued: Feb 8, 1983

Machine for Astro-Turf:
Country - U.S.  #3,736,619  Title: Turf Water Remover                               Date Issued: Jun 5, 1973 
Country - U.S.  #3,835,500  Title: Turf Water Remover                               Date Issued: Sep 17, 1974 
Country - U.S.  #4,069,540  Title: Turf Paint Remover                               Date Issued: Jan 24, 1978 
Country - U.S.  #4,084,763  Title: Turf Handling Machine                            Date Issued: Apr 18, 1978

References

External links
www.zamboni.com — Frank J. Zamboni & Co.

1901 births
1988 deaths
American people of Italian descent
United States Hockey Hall of Fame inductees
People from Eureka, Utah
People from Paramount, California
20th-century American inventors
Deaths from lung cancer in California